The Battle of Sobral (13–14 October 1810) saw an Imperial French army led by Masséna probe the Lines of Torres Vedras, built and defended successfully by Wellington's Anglo-Portuguese Army. Masséna had to order a retreat at the beginning of March 1811 having lost 21,000 men died of hunger and disease induced by scorched earth.

Background

The Peninsular War had started in Portugal with the Invasion of Portugal (1807) and went on till 1814. In September 1810 Masséna made the third French attempt to occupy Portugal with his 65,000 strong army fighting in the Battle of Bussaco, but Wellington pulled back his army southwards. The French army under Masséna pursued Wellington and discovered a barren land without inhabitants, as the Portuguese peasants had left their farms after destroying all food they could not take with them and anything else that might be useful to the French as required by the scorched earth policy. On 11 October 1810, Massena with 61,000 men found Wellington behind an almost impenetrable defensive position, the Lines of Torres Vedras consisting of forts and other military defences built in absolute secrecy to defend the only path to Lisbon from the north.

Battle
Jean-Andoche Junot's VIII Corps was engaged in the fighting on both days. On 13 October, the French drove back the skirmish line of Lowry Cole's 4th Infantry Division. The following day, Junot's troops seized an outpost belonging to Brent Spencer's 1st Infantry Division, but were quickly ejected from the position by a British counterattack.

Aftermath
Masséna soon decided that Wellington's defensive lines were too strong to crack and elected to wait for reinforcements. But the lack of food and fodder meant that Masséna was forced to retreat northwards, starting on the night of 14/15 November 1810, to find an area that had not been subjected to the scorched earth policy. The French held out through February although the Iberian peninsula had suffered one of the coldest winters it had ever known, but when starvation and diseases really set in, Masséna ordered a retreat at the beginning of March 1811 having lost another 21,000 men.

The Third Portuguese campaign proceeded with the Battle of Sabugal.

See also
Fort of Alqueidão
List of forts of the Lines of Torres Vedras
Attrition warfare against Napoleon

Notes

References

External links
 

Battles involving France
Battles involving the United Kingdom
Battles involving Portugal
Battles of the Napoleonic Wars
Battles of the Peninsular War
Conflicts in 1810
1810 in Portugal
October 1810 events
Lines of Torres Vedras